Jean-Yves Prieur,  Kid Loco is a French electronic musician, DJ, remixer and producer. He was born on 19 June 1964 in Antony, Hauts-de-Seine, France.  Allmusic considers his style to be similar to Air and Dimitri from Paris. His best-known album is A Grand Love Story (1997), and he has also compiled and mixed a DJ mix album for the Another Late Night series on Azuli Records.

He has worked with Jarvis Cocker (of Pulp), with Italian band The Transistors (Maurizio Mansueti and Luca Cirillo) and Glasgow bands A Band Called Quinn and Mogwai, and produced the album Too Late To Die Young by the British group Departure Lounge.

Discography

Albums
 Blues Project (1996, Yellow Productions / East West Records)
 A Grand Love Story (1997, Yellow Productions / East West Records)
 Jesus Life For Children Under 12 Inches (1999, Yellow Productions / East West Records)
 Kill Your Darlings (2001, Yellow Productions / Atlantic Records)
 Confessions of a Belladonna Eater (2011, Flor/Green United Music)
 The Mystic West  (2015, KPM Music Ltd.)
 The Rare Birds (2019, Wagram Music)

Remixes
 Prelude to a Grand Love Story (1999, Yellow / East West)
 Jesus Life for Children Under 12 Inches (1999, Yellow / Atlantic / East West)
 DJ-Kicks: Kid Loco (1999, Studio !K7)
 Another Late Night: Kid Loco (DJ mix album, 2003, Azuli)

Singles
 "Blues Project" CD/12 inch (1996, Yellow / East West)
 "The Real Pop Porn Blue Sound" 10 inch (1997, Yellow)
 "More Real Pop Porn Blue Sound" 10 inch (1997, Yellow)
 "She's My Lover" CD/12 inch (1997, Yellow / East West)
 "Love Me Sweet" CD/7 inch (1998, Yellow / East West)
 "Relaxin' With Cherry" 12 inch (1998, Yellow)
 "Flyin on 747" 12 inch (1999, Studio !K7)
 "The Love & Dope & etc. Dream Suite" CD/12 inch (2001, Yellow / East West)
 "A Little Bit of Soul" CD/12 inch (2001, Yellow / Royal Belleville Music)
 "Paralysed" 7 inch (2003, Azuli)
 "Pretty Boy Floyd" (2008, Village Vert / PIAS)

Other releases
 Kid Loco Vs. Godchild – (100% official reissue CD1) (2002) (remixer CD2)
 Delta State (Soundtrack) (2004)
 The Graffiti Artist (Original Soundtrack) (2005, MettrayReformatoryPicture)
 Monsieur Gainsbourg Revisited (Tribute to Serge Gainsbourg) (2006) (producer)
 Party Animals & Disco Biscuits (2008, Village Vert / PIAS / FLOR )
 The Man I Love (performed with Sarah Cracknell) – Red Hot + Rhapsody (1998)

References

External links
Kid Loco's official website was active up until 2012 
 Official website
 Discography at Discogs

1964 births
Living people
People from Antony, Hauts-de-Seine
French electronic musicians
Atlantic Records artists
Bella Union artists